Aphyle cuneata is a moth of the family Erebidae first described by George Hampson in 1905. It is found in French Guiana, Guyana and the Brazilian state of Amazonas.

References

Moths described in 1905
Phaegopterina
Moths of South America